WIMATS is an application software to transcript mathematical and scientific text input into braille script in braille presses. Based on the Nemeth Code, the output can be printed in a variety of braille embossers. This transcription software was jointly developed by Webel Mediatronics Limited (WML) and International Council for Education of People with Visual Impairment (ICEVI), and was officially launched on 17 July 2006. 

WIMATS support inputs of arithmetic, algebra, geometry, trigonometry, calculus, vector, set notations and Greek alphabets. The graphical user interface is very user friendly, and training does not take a long time. This software fulfills a long felt need for the availability of Mathematics and Science study materials at the Higher Secondary and College level for the visually impaired persons. With the introduction of this software, visually impaired persons will no longer need to worry about the availability of books for mathematics and science courses.

ICEVI has presence in 185 countries in the world and the software developed jointly with WML is made available to all these countries through ICEVI.

References
 West Bengal Electronics Industry Development Corporation Limited

Science software